Mikhail Kukushkin was the defending champion but lost to Michael Berrer in the first round.

Marin Čilić won the tournament beating Janko Tipsarević in the final, 6–3, 3–6, 6–2.

Seeds

Qualifying

Draw

Finals

Top half

Bottom half

References
 Main Draw
 Qualifying Draw

2011 Singles
St. Petersburg Open - Singles
2011 in Russian tennis